Atagema scabriuscula is a species of sea slug or dorid nudibranch, a marine gastropod mollusc in the family Discodorididae.

Distribution
This species was described from the Hawaiian Islands. It is a fairly common species in the intertidal zone and shallow water.

References

Discodorididae
Gastropods described in 1860